Kelvin Ndhlovu (born 23 September 1985) is a Zambian squash player. He has represented Zambia at the Commonwealth Games in 2010, 2014 and 2018.

He was also the flagbearer for Zambia at the 2018 Commonwealth Games during the opening ceremony of the 2018 Commonwealth Games Parade of Nations.

References

1985 births
Living people
Zambian male squash players
Squash players at the 2010 Commonwealth Games
Squash players at the 2014 Commonwealth Games
Squash players at the 2018 Commonwealth Games
Commonwealth Games competitors for Zambia